Emanuele Ottonello (born 16 November 1944) is an Italian sailor. He competed in the Flying Dutchman event at the 1968 Summer Olympics.

References

External links
 

1944 births
Living people
Italian male sailors (sport)
Olympic sailors of Italy
Sailors at the 1968 Summer Olympics – Flying Dutchman
Sportspeople from Genoa